Colonel William "Eric" Olmstead Eareckson (May 30, 1900 – October 25, 1966) was an U.S. Army Air Forces combat commander during the World War II Battle of the Aleutian Islands.

Biography
William O. Eareckson was the son of Thomas B Eareckson and Sarah Caroline Eareckson (née Tucker). He was born on Kent Island, Maryland on May 30, 1900.

Eareckson enlisted in the Army at age 17 and fought in France during World War I, where he was wounded.  After the war he remained in the Army and received a presidential appointment to West Point.  While at West Point he composed a fight song for the football team titled "Gridiron Grenadiers". After graduation in 1924, he attended pilot training, but washed out.  He then applied to the become a balloon pilot and was successful.

In 1928, then-Lieutenant Eareckson, together with Captain William E. Kepner, won the National Balloon Elimination Race and the accompanying Paul W. Litchfield Trophy.  It was only two years later, at the relatively advanced age of 30, that Eareckson finally won his airplane pilot rating.  In 1939 he was given command of the 36th Bombardment Squadron.

During the Aleutians fighting, Eareckson was famed for his innovative tactics.  For example, on August 17, 1942, he used radar-equipped B-17s to guide P-38s to a position from where they shot down two of three raiding Japanese Kawanishi H6K bombers.  He also pioneered low-level bombing raids against the enemy to counteract the effects of the consistently poor and unpredictable Aleutian weather.

During the Battle of Attu, Eareckson joined front line infantrymen, borrowed a rifle, and entered the fray – but was quickly wounded by a Japanese sniper.  He was awarded a Purple Heart, but was castigated by General Simon Bolivar Buckner, Jr., Commander of the Alaska Defense Command, for "being where you had no business being". Buckner was later killed in the Battle of Okinawa by Japanese artillery while he was near the front line.

In early 1943, midway through the Aleutians campaign, Eareckson was transferred to General Buckner's staff as Deputy Chief of Staff for the Eleventh Air Force.  He continued to lead combat missions in that capacity.  Later he became a member of Admiral Chester Nimitz's staff.  Nimitz, the Commander in Chief of the Pacific Area, had earlier presented Eareckson with a Navy Cross to complement the Distinguished Service Cross, Silver Star and other combat decorations he had earned in the Aleutians.

He served as the Support Aircraft Commander, Fifth Amphibious Force, South Pacific where he took part in the planning for the Hollandia-Aitape landings and served as Support Aircraft Commander aboard the amphibious command ship at the Makin and Tarawa landings.

Although widely respected for his bravery and leadership skills, Eareckson was viewed by some of his Army Air Forces superiors as caustic, outspoken, and difficult to control.  These liabilities prevented him from being considered for promotion.  When he retired as a colonel in 1954, he had held that rank for 13 years.

He died in Sarasota, Florida on October 25, 1966, and was buried at Arlington National Cemetery.

Namesake
Eareckson Air Station, a military airbase located on the island of Shemya in the Alaskan Aleutian Islands, is named after Eareckson.

References

Further reading
Garfield, Brian The Thousand Mile War, Aurum Press, 1995 

1900 births
1966 deaths
United States Military Academy alumni
Recipients of the Navy Cross (United States)
Recipients of the Silver Star
Aleutian Islands campaign
United States Army soldiers
United States Army personnel of World War I
Recipients of the Distinguished Service Cross (United States)
United States Army Air Forces officers
United States Army Air Forces pilots of World War II
United States Air Force officers
Military personnel from Maryland
Burials at Arlington National Cemetery